Zyrphelis taxifolia, also known by its common name Table Mountain plumeseed is a species from the genus Zyrphelis.

References

Astereae